Uncial 0316 (in the Gregory-Aland numbering), is a Greek uncial manuscript of the New Testament. Palaeographically it has been assigned to the 7th-century.

The codex contains a small texts of the Epistle of Jude 18-25, on one parchment leaf. The leaf has survived in a fragmentary condition.

The text is written in two columns per page, 23-24 lines per page.

It is currently housed at the Morgan Library (M 597 f. II) in New York City.

See also 

 List of New Testament uncials
 Biblical manuscript
 Textual criticism

References

External links 
 "Continuation of the Manuscript List", Institute for New Testament Textual Research, University of Münster. Retrieved April 9, 2008

Greek New Testament uncials
7th-century biblical manuscripts
Collection of the Morgan Library & Museum